The 1994–95 Sussex County Football League season was the 70th in the history of Sussex County Football League a football competition in England.

Division One

Division One featured 18 clubs which competed in the division last season, along with two new clubs, promoted from Division Two:
Shoreham
Southwick

League table

Division Two

Division Two featured 14 clubs which competed in the division last season, along with four new clubs.
Clubs relegated from Division One:
Bexhill Town
Chichester City
Clubs promoted from Division Three:
Bosham
Lingfield

League table

Division Three

Division Three featured 14 clubs which competed in the division last season, along with two new clubs, relegated from Division Two:
Little Common Albion
Midhurst & Easebourne

League table

References

1994-95
1994–95 in English football leagues